Rue des Petits-Champs is a street which runs through the 1st and 2nd arrondissement of Paris, France.

Location
This one-way street, running east-west, is located between rue de la Banque and Avenue de l'Opera.

History 
It was officially created in 1634 by orders of the king during the construction of Palais-Cardinal, it was named "rue Bautru" then "rue Neuve-des-Petits-Champs", In 1881 it was given its present name. In 1944, the part of rue des Petits Champs which extends across Opera near the Place Vendome was renamed rue Danielle Casanova after a French Resistance fighter who died in 1943.

Name origin 
The street received that name because of the small fields, or the large gardens. that used to be there (petits champs meaning small fields in French).

Buildings of note 
Rue des Petits-Champs is lined by several impressive mansions:
 4 - Galerie Vivienne, a registered historical monument, one of the most iconic covered passages in Paris.
 8 - Hôtel du Président Tubeuf, built in 1635. houses the national library's departments of Maps and Plans and Etchings and Photography.
 6 - Bibliothèque Nationale de France | site Richelieu (Galerie Colbert Entrance)
 40 - Passage Choiseul, the longest covered passage in Paris.

Closest transport 
Metro: Line 3 (Quatre Septembre), 1 & 7 (Palais-Royal-Musée du Louvre), 7 & 14 (Pyramides)

Bus: Lines 39 (Bus Sainte-Anne - Petits Champs), 68 21 27 95 (Pyramides)

Trivia
 Jean-Jacques Rousseau lived at number 57
 Louis-Ferdinand Céline (né Destouches) grew up at No. 40 rue des Petits-Champs, in the Passage Choiseul where his mother owned a lace and lingerie shop with family quarters upstairs
 Henri Paul Deputy Director of Security at the Hôtel Ritz Paris and driver of the car in the crash that killed Diana, Princess of Wales on 31 August 1997 lived in an apartment on the fifth floor at number 33.

References

External link

Streets in the 1st arrondissement of Paris
Streets in the 2nd arrondissement of Paris